Nianga (Nyanga) is a village in Kasai province in the Democratic Republic of the Congo.

The town was founded as a mission post in 1923. During colonial times, Nianga was home to a primary school and also a secondary school.

Nianga is connected by road to Route Nationale 1 and is served by Nyanga Airport (FZDG).

References 

Populated places in Kasaï Province